Saint-Brieuc-de-Mauron (literally Saint-Brieuc of Mauron) is a commune in the Morbihan department of Brittany in north-western France.

Demographics
Inhabitants of Saint-Brieuc-de-Mauron are called in French Briochains.

See also
Communes of the Morbihan department

References

External links

 Mayors of Morbihan Association 

Saintbrieucdemauron